Kwang, also spelled Gwang, is a Korean given name and name element. The meaning differs based on the hanja used.

Hanja and meaning
There are 13 hanja with this reading, and three variant forms, on the South Korean government's official list of hanja which may be used in given names; they are:

 : "light"
  (variants)
 : "wide"
  (variant)
 : "ore"
 : "wild"
 : "abundant"
 : "glitter"
 : "jade piri" (a wind instrument)
 : "Arenga pinnata" (a species of sugar palm)
 : "correct"
 : "empty"
 : "tomb"
 : "basket"
 : "urinary bladder"

People
People with the given name Kwang include:
Jo Gwang, chief retainer of the Gaya Confederacy
Yi Gwang (1541–1607), Joseon Dynasty male general
Im Gwang (1579–1644), Joseon Dynasty male scholar-official
Choe Kwang (1919–1997), North Korean male military leader
Choi Kwang (economist) (born 1947), South Korean male economist, former Minister of Health and Welfare
Jang Gwang (born 1952), South Korean male voice actor
Li Gwang (born 1966), North Korean male judo practitioner
Li Guang (footballer) (born 1991), Chinese male football player of Korean descent

People with the nickname or stage name Kwang include:
Savio Vega (born 1964) or Kwang the Ninja, Puerto Rican professional wrestler

As name element
Korean given names containing the syllable Kwang include:

Kwang-hee
Kwang-ho
Kwang-hoon
Kwang-hwan
Kwang-hyok
Kwang-hyun
Kwang-jo
Kwang-min
Kwang-seok
Kwang-seon
Kwang-sik
Kwang-su

See also
List of Korean given names

References

Korean given names